The Forest Guard (is the name of the agency responsible for the protection of forests and implementation of the forestry law in Greece.

History
The first agency for the protection of forests and fields was founded in 1836 as the Rural Police (Αγροφυλακή).

In 1956, the Rural Police was organised along the standards of the Gendarmerie and became part of the Ministry of Public Order. In 2011, the Rural Police was disestablished and its services were passed to the various regional forest services. 

These various regional forest services, grouped as the "Forest Command", form part of the Ministry of Agricultural Development and provide services all over Greece (Dasarcheio, Dasonomeio, Dasofylakeio).

In 2017, common uniforms were adopted for all members of the Forest Guard.

References

Sources
Πολίτες δασοφύλακες, dasarxeio.com

Public services of Greece
Emergency services in Greece